RNA polymerase-associated protein CTR9 homolog is an enzyme that in humans is encoded by the CTR9 gene.

Model organisms
Model organisms have been used in the study of CTR9 function. A conditional knockout mouse line called Ctr9tm1b(EUCOMM)Wtsi was generated at the Wellcome Trust Sanger Institute. Male and female animals underwent a standardized phenotypic screen to determine the effects of deletion. Additional screens performed:  - In-depth immunological phenotyping

References

External links

Further reading